Kottayi is a gram panchayat in the Palakkad district, state of Kerala, India. It is a local government organisation that serves the villages of Kottayi-I and Kottayi-II.

References 

Gram panchayats in Palakkad district